Dmytro Chumak may refer to:

 Dmytro Chumak (fencer) (born 1980), Ukrainian épée fencer
 Dmytro Chumak (weightlifter) (born 1990), Ukrainian weightlifter